The Hotel Zipser is located in the Lange Gasse in the 8th district in Vienna. The hotel is a member of the PrivateCityHotels Group.

History 

In the 19th century, the house “Zum Heiligen Anton” and later “Zur Goldenen Ente” (registration 113/1846) stood here.

Ms. Karoline Zipser's Home for Young Girls was completed in 1904 at what is the Lange Gasse No. 49 today. Alterations were made soon thereafter, converting it to the Pension Zipser with eleven single and two double rooms.

The Austrian writer Ödön von Horváth Ödön von Horváth lodged in the Pension Zipser a number of times between 1920 and 1931, which he also references in his book Tales from the Vienna Woods.

Hedwig Austerer bought the Pension in 1967 and extended the 28 rooms at that time to a total of 53. Manfred Austerer took over his parents’ business in 1972. Manfred and his wife Elisabeth Austerer made several renovations and alterations to the building over the years. Their younger son Bernhard Austerer joined the family business in 1999. Ongoing extensions and modernisation finally transformed the Pension Zipser into today's Hotel Zipser.

Coat of arms

The coat of arms on the façade of the building has the coat of arms of the French community Orsay at its centre.

Literature 
References:
 Traugott Krischke: Horváth-Chronik. Suhrkamp Verlag, 1988, S.29, S.70
 Traugott Krischke: Horváths „Geschichten aus dem Wiener Wald“. Suhrkamp Verlag, 1983, S.36
 Jürg Amann: Zimmer zum Hof. Haymon Verlag, 2006, S.14

References

External links 
 Hotel Zipser

Hotels in Vienna
Hotel Zipser
Hotels established in 1904